Peripsocus subfasciatus is a species of Psocoptera from the Peripsocidae family that can be found in Great Britain and Ireland. The species are either black or brown coloured.

Habitat 
The species feed on beech, blackthorn, broom, cedar, Chinese juniper, elder, elm, hawthorn, larch, oak, pine, sallow, sea buckthorn. It also likes to feed on apples, rowan, and sweet chestnuts.

References 

Peripsocidae
Insects described in 1842
Psocoptera of Europe
Taxa named by Jules Pierre Rambur